John Lampert Worrall is a professor of criminology at the University of Texas at Dallas's School of Economic, Political and Policy Sciences. He is known for his research on crime control, policing, and criminal courts. He is the editor-in-chief of Police Quarterly.

Education and career
Worrall received his B.A. from Central Washington University and his M.A. and Ph.D. from Washington State University. He was formerly a professor at California State University, San Bernardino before joining the faculty of UT-Dallas. He is a member of both the Academy of Criminal Justice Sciences and the American Society of Criminology.

References

External links
Faculty page

American criminologists
Living people
Academic journal editors
University of Texas at Dallas faculty
Central Washington University alumni
Washington State University alumni
California State University, San Bernardino faculty
Year of birth missing (living people)